Homalopsis buccata (puff-faced water snake or masked water snake) is a species of mildly venomous snake in the Homalopsidae family found in tropical areas of Southeast Asia.

Description

Upper labials 1–4 contact single loreal; two prefrontals; 33–40 dorsal scale rows at mid-body, usually reduced to fewer than 30 posteriorly; one postocular plus a postsubocular; 12 (11–14) upper labials; ventral count fewer than 166. 

Homalopsis buccata has a banded pattern and usually reaches 1 meter (3 feet) in length. They have a somewhat similar body build to the anaconda, but instead of constriction they use a mild venom from a grooved rear fang to subdue prey.

Distribution
H. buccata ranges from northern Sumatra to Salanga Island, Indonesia and Borneo; it is present on the Malaysian peninsula and in extreme southern Thailand (vicinity of Pattani).

Reproduction
H. buccata are ovoviviparous, meaning they do not lay eggs but rather give birth to live young. Females give birth to 2-20 live young, with an average of 9.26 young per breeding. Studies have shown this species breeds year round, with a peak season of October–March (though no distinctive breeding season was found).

Diet
H. buccata prey are said to include: tilapia, guppy, catfish, Asian swamp eel, various other small fish, a variety of frogs, freshwater crustaceans.

In captivity, the species feeds readily on minnows, goldfish, various cichlid fish, tilapia, Mollies (Poecilia), and tadpoles.

Notes

References
 Boulenger, George A. 1890 The Fauna of British India, Including Ceylon and Burma. Reptilia and Batrachia. Taylor & Francis, London, xviii, 541 pp.
 Stuart, B.L.; Smith, J.; Davey, K.; Din, P. & Platt, S.G. 2000 Homalopsine watersnakes. The harvest and trade from Tonle Sap, Cambodia. Traffic Bull. 18 (3): 115-124

External links
 Homalopsinae.com
 

Colubrids
Fauna of Southeast Asia
Reptiles of Thailand
Taxa named by Carl Linnaeus
Reptiles described in 1758